Mark Kisin is a mathematician known for work in algebraic number theory and arithmetic geometry. In particular, he is known for his contributions to the study of p-adic representations and p-adic cohomology.

Born in Vilnius, Lithuania and raised from the age of five in Melbourne, Australia, he won a silver medal at the International Mathematical Olympiad in 1989  and received his B.Sc. from Monash University in 1991. He received his Ph.D. from Princeton University in 1998 under the direction of Nick Katz. From 1998 to 2001 he was a Research Fellow at the University of Sydney, after which he spent three years at the University of Münster.

After six years at the University of Chicago, Kisin took the post in 2009 of professor of mathematics at Harvard University.

He was elected a Fellow of the Royal Society in 2008. He gave an invited talk at the International Congress of Mathematicians in 2010, on the topic of "Number Theory". In 2012 he became a fellow of the American Mathematical Society. He was elected to the American Academy of Arts and Sciences in 2022.

References

External links
 

Living people
Scientists from Vilnius
20th-century American mathematicians
21st-century American mathematicians
Australian mathematicians
Harvard University faculty
Fellows of the Royal Society
Fellows of the American Mathematical Society
International Mathematical Olympiad participants
Academic staff of Monash University
Princeton University alumni
Academic staff of the University of Sydney
Academic staff of the University of Münster
Arithmetic geometers
1971 births